An election to the Carmarthen Rural District Council in Wales was held in April 1925. It was preceded by the 1922 election  and was followed by the 1928 election. The successful candidates were also elected to the Carmarthen Board of Guardians.

Overview of the results
Many Independent candidates were returned unopposed and only a small number of wards were contested by Labour candidates.

Ward Results

Abergwili (two seats)

Abernant (one seat)

Conwil (two seats)

Laugharne Parish (one seat)

Laugharne Township (one seat)

Llanarthney North Ward (one seat)

Llanarthney South Ward (two seats)

Llandawke and Llansadurnen (one seat)

Llanddarog (one seat)

Llandeilo Abercowyn and Llangynog (one seat)

Llanddowror (one seat)

Llandyfaelog (one seat)

Llanfihangel Abercowin (one seat)

Llangain (one seat)

Llangendeirne (two seats)

Llangunnor (one seat)

Llangynin (one seat)

Llanllawddog (one seat)

Llanpumsaint (one seat)

Llanstephan (one seat)

Llanwinio (one seat)

Merthyr (one seat)

Mydrim (one seat)

Newchurch (one seat)

St Clears (one seat)

St Ishmaels (one seat)

Trelech a'r Betws (two seats)

Carmarthen Board of Guardians

All members of the District Council also served as members of Carmarthen Board of Guardians. In addition six members were elected to represent the borough of Carmarthen. All six sitting members were returned unopposed.

Carmarthen (six seats)

References

1925 Welsh local elections
Elections in Carmarthenshire
20th century in Carmarthenshire